London South was an electoral riding in Ontario, Canada. It was created in 1926 and was abolished in 1933 before the 1934 election. It was re-established in 1955 and existed until 1999 when it was abolished again.

Members of Provincial Parliament

Electoral history (1975-1999)

References

Former provincial electoral districts of Ontario
Politics of London, Ontario